The Marion-Handley was an automobile built in Jackson, Michigan by the Mutual Motors Corporation from 1916 to 1918.

History 

Mutual Motors Corporation was formed combining the Imperial Automobile Company and Marion Motor Car Company. The Imperial was discontinued and the Marion became the Marion-Handley.

Two models were available, a touring car and a four-seater roadster.  The 6-40 model was built on a  wheelbase, and the 6-60 was offered with a  wheelbase.  The Marion-Handley was an assembled car equipped with a Continental six-cylinder engine.  Wooden artillery wheels were standard equipment on the touring car, but the roadster model offered wire wheels as an option. Factory price in 1917 was $1,575, . Mutual Motors ended production in 1918 after 2,081 cars had been produced. The factory was sold in 1919.

References
Defunct motor vehicle manufacturers of the United States
Motor vehicle manufacturers based in Michigan
Defunct manufacturing companies based in Michigan
Brass Era vehicles
Vintage vehicles
1910s cars

Manufacturing companies established in 1916
Manufacturing companies disestablished in 1918
Cars introduced in 1916